The Cardellino was a small single-cylinder, two-stroke motorcycle produced by Moto Guzzi from 1954 until 1962.

See also
List of Moto Guzzi motorcycles
List of motorcycles by type of engine
List of motorcycles of the 1950s

Cardellino
Motorcycles introduced in 1954
Two-stroke motorcycles
Standard motorcycles